The City Municipality of Velenje is one of twelve city municipalities of Slovenia. It lies in eastern Slovenia and was established in 1994. Its seat is the town of Velenje. The area traditionally belongs to the region of Styria and has been included in the Savinja Statistical Region since 1995.

Settlements

In addition to the municipal seat of Velenje, the municipality also includes the following settlements:

 Arnače
 Bevče
 Črnova
 Hrastovec
 Janškovo Selo
 Kavče
 Laze
 Lipje
 Lopatnik
 Lopatnik pri Velenju
 Ložnica
 Paka pri Velenju
 Paški Kozjak
 Pirešica
 Plešivec
 Podgorje
 Podkraj pri Velenju
 Prelska
 Šenbric
 Silova
 Škale
 Škalske Cirkovce
 Šmartinske Cirkovce
 Vinska Gora

References

External links

Official site
City Municipality of Velenje at Geopedia.si (map, aerial photograph)

 
Velenje
1994 establishments in Slovenia